Charley is an English unisex given name and a surname. As an English given name, it is a diminutive form of Charles and a feminine form of Charlie. Notable people known by this name include the following:

Given name

Charley Ane (1931–2007), American gridiron football player
Charley Armey (born 1939), American football coach, scout, and executive
Charley Aull (1869–1958), American gridiron football player
Charley Aylett (1913–1966), Australian politician
Charley Barden (1874–1962), British cyclist
Charley Barnes (born 1939), American gridiron football player
Charley Barrett (1893–1924), American gridiron football player
Charley Bassett (1863–1942), American baseball player
Charley Belanger (1901–1970), Canadian boxer
Charley Booker (1925–1989), American singer and guitarist
Charley Boorman (born 1966), English TV presenter, travel writer and actor
Charley Borah (1905–1980), American sprint athlete
Charley Boswell (1916–1995), American gridiron football player and blind golf player
Charley Bowser (1898–1989), American football coach
Charley Brewer (fullback) (1873–1958), American gridiron football player
Charles Brewer (American football), American gridiron football player
Charley Britt (born 1938), American gridiron football player
Charley Brock (1916–1987), American gridiron football player
Charley Bryan, nickname of Charles S. Bryan (born 1942), American infectious disease physician, researcher, and author
Charley Burley (1917–1992), African American boxer
Charley Casserly (born c. 1949), American gridiron football sportscaster and executive
Charley Chase (1893–1940), American comedian, screenwriter and film director
Charley Cobb, American football coach
Charlie Conerly (1921–1996), American gridiron football quarterback
Charley Cowan (1938–1998), American gridiron football player
Charley Crockett (born 1984), Americana singer, guitarist, and songwriter
Charley Czarnecki, nickname of Walter Czarnecki (1916–1996), American basketball player
Charley Dewberry, American ichthyologists and author
Charley Diamond (born 1936), American gridiron football player
Charley L. Diaz (born 1959), United States Coast Guard captain
Charley Dickens, nickname of Charles Dickens Jr., son of Charles Dickens
Charley Donnelly (1885–1967), American educator, golfer, and college football and golf coach
Charley Drayton (born 1965), American multi-instrumental musician and producer
Charley Eckman (1921–1995), American basketball coach, referee, broadcaster, and author and baseball player
Charley Edge (born 1997), Welsh footballer
Charley Ellis (born 1944), American boxer
Charley Ewart (1915–1990), American gridiron football player
Charley Ferrer (born 1963), Puerto Rican Doctor of Human Sexuality
Charley Feeney (1924–2014), American sportswriter 
Charley Ferguson (born 1939), American gridiron football player
Charley Roussel Fomen (born 1989), Cameroonian footballer
Charley Ford, nickname of Charles Ford (outlaw) (1857–1884), American outlaw, James Gang member, and brother of Robert Ford
Charley Fox (1920–2008), Royal Canadian Air Force Lieutenant
Charley Foy (1898–1984), American actor
Charley Frazier (born 1939), American gridiron football player
Charley Fusari (1924–1985), Italian-American boxer
Charley Genever, British poet
Charley Goldman (1887–1968), Polish boxing trainer
Charley Grapewin (1869–1956), American vaudeville performer and a stage and film actor
Charley Griffith (1929–1999), American NASCAR driver 
Charley Hall (1884–1943), American baseball player
Charley Hamrick (1912–1963), American gridiron football player
Charley Hannah (born 1955), American gridiron football player
Charley Harper (1922–2007), American artist
Charley Harraway (born 1944), American gridiron football player
Charley Hearn (born 1983), English footballer
Charley Hennigan or Charlie Hennigan, nicknames for Charles Taylor Hennigan Sr., (1935–2017), American gridiron football player
Charley Henley, visual effects artist
Charley Hoffman (born 1976), American golfer
Charley Horton, nickname of Charles Horton, American gridiron football player
Charley Hughlett (born 1990), American gridiron football player
Charley Hull (born 1996), English golfer
Charley Hyatt (1908–1978), American basketball player 
Charley Eugene Johns (1905–1990), American politician
Charley Johnson (born 1938), American gridiron football player
Charley Johnson (wrestler) (1887–1967), American wrestler
Charley Jones (1852–1911), American baseball player
Charley Jones (American football) (1929–2000), American gridiron football player
Charley E. Jones, publisher of Charley Jones' Laugh Book Magazine
Charley Jordan (1890–1954), America musician
Charley Leundeu Keunang, 2015 police shooting victim
Charley Koontz (born 1987), American actor
Charley Kurtsinger, nickname of Charles Kurtsinger (1906–1946), American jockey
Charley Langer, American saxophonist and composer
Charley Lau (1933–1984), American baseball player and coach 
Charley Lincoln (1900–1963), American musician
Charley Lockhart (1876–1954), American politician and dwarf
Charley Malone (1910–1992), American gridiron football player
Charley Marcuse, American hot dog vendor 
Charley Marouani (1926–2017), Tunisian impresario and celebrity agent
Charley McDowell, nickname of Charles McDowell Jr. (journalist), (1926–2010), American writer and syndicated columnist 
Charley McVeigh (1898–1984), Canadian ice hockey player
Charley Mitchell (American football) (1948-1993), American gridiron football player
Charley Mitchell (boxer) (1861–1918), English boxer
Charley Molnar (born 1961), American football coach
Charley Moore (1884–1970), American baseball player and manager
Charley Moran (1878–1949), American baseball player and umpire and gridiron football coach
Charley Morin, nickname of Charles R. Morin (1870–1947), American billiards player
Charley Morgan (born 1929), American sailboat racer and designer
Charley O'Leary (1875–1941), American baseball player
Charley Paddock (1900–1943), American sprint athlete
Charley Parkhurst (1812–1879), American stagecoach driver, farmer and rancher
Charley Patton (?? – 1934), American musician
Charley Pell (1941–2001), American gridiron football coach
Charley Pettys (born 1990), American-born, Filipino footballer
Charley Pierce (c. 1866–1895), American outlaw
Charley Price (1890–1967), English cricketer
Charley Pride (1934–2020), American country singer
Charley Reese (1937–2013), American syndicated columnist
Charley Retzlaff (1904–1970), American boxer
Charley Reynolds (1842–1876), American scout
Charley Riley (1922–1994), American boxer
Charley Robinson (1925–2007), American gridiron football player
Charley Rogers (1887–1956), English film actor, director and screenwriter
Charley Rosen (born 1941), American author and basketball coach
Charley Phil Rosenberg or Charlie Phil Rosenberg professional names of Charles Green (1902–1976), American boxer
Charley Ross (1870 - ?), murder victim; first American kidnapping victim for purely ransom reason
Charley Palmer Rothwell (born 1992), English actor
Charley Sarratt (born 1923), American gridiron football player
Charley Scales (born 1938) American gridiron football player 
Charley Scalies, American actor
Charley Schanz (1919–1992), American baseball player
Charley Seabright (1918–1981), American gridiron Football player
Charley Shin, founder of Charleys Philly Steaks
Charley Shipp (1913–1988), American basketball player and coach
Charley Smith (1937–1994), American baseball player
Charley Speed (born 1979), British model and actor
Charley Stanceu (1916–1969), American baseball player
Charley Steinberg, nickname for Charles M. Steinberg (1932–1999), American immunobiologist  
Charley Steiner (born 1949), American sportscaster
Charley Stis (1884–1979), American baseball infielder, manager, scout and umpire
Charley Stone English musician
Charley Straight (1891–1940), American pianist, bandleader and composer
Charley Suche (1915–1984), American baseball player 
Charley Taylor (born 1941), American football player
Charley Thomas (born 1986), Canadian curler 
Charley Thornton (1936–2004), American college athletics administrator
Charley Trudeau, nickname of Joseph Charles-Émile Trudeau (1887–1935), Canadian entrepreneur, father of Pierre Trudeau and grandfather of Justin Trudeau
Charley Toomey American lacrosse coach
Charley Toorop (1891–1955), Dutch artist
Charley Trippi (born 1921), American football player
Charley Tolar or Charlie Tolar, nickname for Charles Guy Tolar, (1937–2003), American gridiron football player
Charley Trujillo (born 1949), Chicano novelist, editor, publisher, and filmmaker
Charley Turner (1862–1913), American boxer
Charley Valera (born 1957), American author
Charley van de Weerd (1922–2008), Dutch football player
Charley Walters (born 1947), American baseball player
Charley Warner (born 1940), American gridiron football player
Charley Way (1897–1988), American football player and coach
Charley Webb of The Webb Sisters (born 1978) - one half of the Webb Sisters
Charley Wensloff (1915–2001), American baseball player
Charley White (born 1891), English boxer
Charley Wilkinson (born 1955), American musician
Charley Williams (born 1928), American boxer
Charley Winner (born 1924), American gridiron football coach
Charley Young (born 1952), American gridiron football player
Charley Zivic (1925–1984), American boxer

Nicknames
Chilly Charley or Snarley Charley, pseudonyms for Charles Clark (publisher, born 1806), (1806–1880), English publisher, farmer and satirist
Mountain Charley (disambiguation)
"One Armed" Charley Monell, owner of Hole-in-the-Wall (saloon), New York City underworld saloon
Piano Charley, nickname of Charles W. Bullard, American criminal

Surname
Boston Charley (1854–1873), North American warrior
Dele Charley (1948–1993), Sierra Leonean writer
Germaine Charley (1887–1959), French actress
Honest Charley (1905 – 1974), American businessman
Peter Charley, Australian journalist, documentary film maker and television producer
Reginald Charley (1892–1986), British flying ace
Scarface Charley (c. 1851–1896), chief of the Modoc tribe of Native Americans
Simone Charley (born 1995), American football player and athlete 
William Thomas Charley (1833–1904), British judge and politician

Fictional characters

Charley, the main protagonist and subject of the titular British animated educational short film series produced by Halas & Batchelor for the Central Office of Information from 1946 to 1947
Charley, animated cat subject of 1970s and 1980s Charley Says cartoon information films from the British government's Central Office of Information, subject of Little Charley Bear BBC show
Charley, subject of Canadian Charley and Mimmo series
Charley, Willy Loman's neighbor from the stage play Death of a Salesman
Charley, John Steinbeck's companion poodle for his 1962 travelogue Travels with Charley
Charley, subject of Charley Skedaddle
Charley Appleby, Fred MacMurray role opposite the Golden Globe Award for Best Actress-nominated role in Charley and the Angel
Charley Bates from Oliver Twist
Charley Bones, from Mona the Vampire
Charley Bourne, the protagonist in the comic strip Charley's War
Charley Pollard, from the audio plays based on the television series Doctor Who
Charley Shallow, a character in Philip Reeve's Mortal Engines prequel series Fever Crumb
Charley Varrick, Walter Matthau BAFTA Award for Best Actor in a Leading Role-winning character from Charley Varrick
Charley Wykeham, Oxford University student character from Charley's Aunt, and its adaptations and derivatives
Charley, Fred Williamson character in The Legend of Nigger Charley (1972) and The Soul of Nigger Charley (1973)
Little Charley Bear, subject of Little Charley Bear BBC show

See also

Notes

English feminine given names
English masculine given names